Stanislav Anatolyevich Lysenko (born 8 January 1972) is a Russian professional football official and a former player.

Club career
He made his professional debut in the Soviet Second League B in 1990 for FC Kuban Barannikovsky.

Honours
 Russian Cup winner: 2002 (played in the early stages of the 2001/02 tournament for PFC CSKA Moscow).

Personal life
His son Nikita Lysenko is now a football player as well.

References

1972 births
Sportspeople from Krasnodar
Living people
Soviet footballers
Russian footballers
Association football defenders
Association football midfielders
FC Kuban Krasnodar players
FC Rubin Kazan players
PFC CSKA Moscow players
Russian Premier League players
FC Slavyansk Slavyansk-na-Kubani players